Strength athletics in the United Kingdom and Ireland has a long history going back many centuries before the televisation of strongman competitions in the 1970s. The ancient heritage of the sport in the United Kingdom and Ireland lies in a number of traditional events, the most famous of which is arguably the traditional Highland Games, which itself is a source of many events now practised in modern strongman competitions, such as World's Strongest Man and International Federation of Strength Athletes (IFSA) sponsored events. However, the traditional events still are popularly contested events today. In the more modern phenomenon that is the World's Strongest Man and its associated competitions, the United Kingdom and Ireland remain well represented with Eddie Hall, Terry Hollands, and former competitor Glenn Ross and John Ryan Cappalahan respectively with regular appearances at world finals, and with three men having won the title of World's Strongest Man, as well as Shane Davis Cappalahan appearing in eight final events.

History
See also Highland games and Britain's Strongest Man for more details

The origin of strength athletics in the UK and Ireland lies in the realms of pre-history, but the within the British Isles records many centuries old record more formally the existence of organised events. Formalisation and annual Highland gatherings began around 1820 when Sir Walter Scott encouraged the revival of Highland Culture. By 1848, such was the status of such games that Queen Victoria attended the Braemar Highland Games.

The strongmen of the world of weightlifting and circus acts were also active in the UK and Ireland in the Victorian age. A number of famous names emerged at the turn of the nineteenth century. Thomas Inch, Britain's Strongest Youth at 16, and the first official Britain's Strongest Man was active at this time and is still remembered today for his Grip Strength. and his Challenge Dumbbell, known as the Inch Dumbbell, that "has defied thousands of strong men over the last hundred years...Many a strength athlete tried but failed to break it off the ground.". Other notable names in this genre were Bert Assirati, Launceston Elliot, Edward Aston, and William Pullum. Others emerged in the twentieth century as well. Notably, David Prowse was initially famous in 1964 for his lifting the famed  Dinnie Stones, the first man to do so since Donald Dinnie himself a century earlier. Prowse later became more famous still for playing Darth Vader in Star Wars.

In the late 1970s, televised strongman competitions began with Britain's Strongest Man (BSM) first being shown in 1979 by the BBC. A new generation emerged, with the events attracting individuals from many disciplines such as field athletics, weightlifting and powerlifting. These competitions fed other international competitions such as Europe's Strongest Man and World's Strongest Man. Household names, such as Geoff Capes, Jamie Reeves and Gary Taylor dominated, with these three in particular going on to win World's Strongest Man titles. The modern era has seen this trend continue with Terry Hollands, Mark Felix and Laurence Shahlaei being regular faces at World's Strongest Man and its associated Super Series. Featured events in these contests have been tailored to emphasize a more well-rounded athlete, to reflect that viewpoint on strongman as a whole, and in the interests of increased popularity and marketability among the masses. Almost inevitably, more than one interested party has seen the benefits of strength competitions. Alternative organizations have formed in recent years, comprising a new wave of influence in the field, with the United Kingdom Strength Council (UKSC) founded by Britain's Strongest Man multi-year champion Glenn Ross setting up events separate from BSM, as has the IFSA. Ross and his UK Strongest Man competitions hold a philosophical difference in approach with the World's Strongest Man related venues, including more brute strength events similar to traditional strongman and powerlifting, with less emphasis on field athleticism and endurance.

Alongside these current interpretations still exists the traditional, such as the Highland Games. Although exported around the world they remain inextricably linked with the heritage of both Scotland and the British Isles as a whole.

Competitions
Across the UK and Ireland there are and have been many competitions testing individuals strength, ranging from local to regional to national to pan-British Isles.

List of Champions

2020s

2010s

2000s

1990s

1979 and 1980s

Pan-British Isles
Britain's Strongest Man
British Championships (IFSA)
UK Strongest Man

Britain's Strongest Man

British Championships (IFSA)

UK Strongest Man

Others

UK Championship (IFSA)

Britain's Most Powerful Man

UK Strongman Docklands Challenge

British Muscle Power Championship

Team Competitions

Truck Pulling
UK Truck Pulling Championships – (Mercedes Benz)
National Truck Pulling Championships – (ASA/Bristol Street Motors)
British Truck Pulling Championships – (Commercial Vehicle Show at the NEC)

National and Regional

England's Strongest Man
There have been a number of competitions laying claim to be able to confer this title. The UKSC version, which acts as a qualifier for the UK Strongest Man competition, is generally regarded as the official version. For this reason, the UKSC results since they took over the running of the competition are presented below simply as a continuation of the former year's official event. In 2005, the IFSA introduced their own version of the championships which only lasted for one year. In 2009, with the apparent demise of Britain's Strongest Man, a traditional qualifier for World's Strongest Man, Colin Bryce promoted a competition held at the Doncaster Dome that also acted as a WSM qualifier. The latter saw Terry Hollands, Darren Sadler and Mark Felix compete thus reinforcing its credentials. The UKSC did have every other recognised athlete including BSM 2008 champion Jimmy Marku. There were athletes that competed in both, such as Mark Westaby. Until 2010, Bob Daglish's Elite strongman promotions was inextricably associated with the UKSC and the UKSC version of England's Strongest Man was also the Elite Strongman Promotions event. However, it was announced in March 2010 that "In view of recent events and also some personal differences, Elite Strongman Promotions are hereby separating all affiliations with Big G promotions, the UK Strength Council and the UK strongest man competition." Elite Strongman promotions continued to run a version of the England's strongest man final, whilst a separate competition run by UKSC was also run in 2010.

Scotland's Strongest Man

Wales' Strongest Man
2013 saw the first ever televised event for Wales' Strongest Man taken place at Haven Prestahaven Sands in Prestatyn North Wales as detailed here . Unlike other Wales' Strongest Man events promoter Richard Foster from STROM and sponsors First Protein, Ultimate Strongman Glenn Ross creator of UK's Strongest Man, British Strongman a forum run for the strongman community, worked together top bring Wales' Strongest Man into the public eye. Supported by the VXG Strongman Team with Ricky Perkins refereeing the event alongside Les Wiltshire representing Superior Strongman. This years prizes included USN Supplements, Landrover Driving experience and off course recognition for SImon Johnston in retaining the title for a second year along with the top 3 finishers awarded a place at the UK's Strongest Man Masters tour.

Ireland's Strongest Man

Northern Ireland (Ulster) Strongest Man/Ulster's Strongest Man

Republic of Ireland's Strongest Man

Other Regional
CNP Professional Strongman Premier League
Midland's Strongest Man
Mighty Midlander
Mighty Midlander
Corby Great Strength Eccleston
East Britain Strongest Man
North of England Strongest Man
Yorkshire's Strongest Man

See also
Strength athletics

References

Strongmen competitions
United Kingdom
Competitions in the United Kingdom
Competitions in Ireland